The Ely Springs Range is a mountain range located in Lincoln County, southeastern Nevada.

See also
Ely Springs Dolomite

References 

Mountain ranges of Nevada
Mountain ranges of Lincoln County, Nevada
Mountain ranges of the Great Basin